Krueppel-like factor 5 is a protein that in humans is encoded by the KLF5 gene.

Function 

This gene encodes a member of the Kruppel-like factor subfamily of zinc finger proteins. Since the protein localizes to the nucleus and binds the epidermal growth factor response element, it is thought to be a transcription factor.

Interactions 

KLF5 has been shown to interact with Protein SET.

See also 
 Kruppel-like factors

References

Further reading

External links 
 

Transcription factors